Phantom Limbs: Selected B-Sides is a compilation double album by Australian band Something for Kate. Released in 2004, it contains B-sides from singles released from their first four albums, including live versions and cover versions of songs by artists including David Bowie, Duran Duran and Australian rock band Jebediah.

Track listing

Disc One
(All songs by Something for Kate except where noted)
"Hawaiian Robots" (B-side to 'Monsters') – 4:53 [2001]
"All the Things That Aren't Good About Scientology" (B-side to 'Working Against Me') – 3:58 [1998]
"Born Yesterday" (B-side to 'The Astronaut') – 4:33 [2000]
"Losing My Mind" (B-side to 'Déjà vu') – 4:55 [2003]
"Chapel Street Etc." (B-side to 'Captain (Million Miles an Hour)') – 4:34 [1997]
"You Can't Please Everybody, Rockwell" (B-side to 'Roll Credit') – 4:48 [1998]
"3 x 2" (B-side to 'Prick') – 6:41 [1997]
"The Green Line Is Us, the Red Line Is Them" (B-side to 'Three Dimensions') – 5:23 [2001]
"Sleep Is Worth the Wait" (B-side to 'Electricity') – 5:57 [1999]
"Telescope" (B-side to 'Working Against Me') – 6:37 [1998]
"Blueprint Architecture" (B-side to 'Déjà vu') – 3:30 [2003]
"Mental Note" (B-side to 'Hallways') – 4:39 [1999]
"Belief = Function = Belief" (B-side to 'Whatever You Want') – 4:53 [1999]
"Coloured Chalk" (B-side to 'Electricity') – 4:11 [1999]
"Submarine" (B-side to 'Monsters') – 5:15 [2001]

Disc Two
"Faster" (B-side to 'Song for a Sleepwalker') – 5:42 [2003]
"Anchorman II" (B-side to 'Song for a Sleepwalker') – 4:50 [2003]
"A Remarkable Lack of Foresight" (B-side to 'Twenty Years') – 5:25 [2001]
"Dreamworld" (Jim Moginie) (B-side to 'Say Something') – 3:48 [2002]
"Harpoon" (Jebediah) (B-side to 'Roll Credit') – 4:21 [1998]
"Ordinary World" (Simon Le Bon, Warren Cuccurullo, Nick Rhodes, John Taylor) (B-side to 'The Astronaut') – 6:07 [2000]
"Ashes to Ashes" (Live at the POW) (David Bowie) (B-side to 'Moving Right Along') – 4:36 [2004]
"Whatever You Want" (live at the Chapel) (B-side to 'Say Something') – 4:15 [2002]
"The Astronaut" (live acoustic) (B-side to 'Monsters') – 3:10 [2001]
"Anchorman" (live at the Forum) (B-side to 'Twenty Years') – 5:21 [2001]
"You Only Hide" (live acoustic) (B-side to 'Déjà vu') – 4:17 [2003]
"Pinstripe" (acoustic) (B-side to 'Electricity') – 5:56 [1999]
"Back to You" (piano version) (B-side to 'Whatever You Want') – 4:40 [1999]
"Truly" (live bootleg) (Jody Bleyle) (never before released) – 5:24

Charts

Personnel
Paul Dempsey – guitar, vocals
Clint Hyndman – drums, percussion, backing vocals
Stephanie Ashworth – bass guitar, backing vocals

References

2004 compilation albums
Something for Kate albums
Murmur (record label) albums
B-side compilation albums